The third season of the ABC American television drama series Revenge premiered on September 29, 2013. The show aired on Sundays 9:00 pm Eastern/8:00 pm Central for the first thirteen episodes before moving to the new time of 10:00 pm Eastern/9:00 pm Central from episode 14. Ashley Madekwe and Connor Paolo did not return as Ashley Davenport and Declan Porter, respectively, although Madekwe guest starred in the premiere to conclude her story. On July 12, 2013 it was confirmed that Justin Hartley would join the cast as Patrick Osbourne, Victoria Grayson's long lost son. This is also the first season not to have creator Mike Kelley as executive producer and showrunner. On May 3, 2013, Sunil Nayar was confirmed as Kelley's replacement. The premiere features a flashforward where Emily is shot and the first half of the season leads up to the shooting.

The season premiere was watched by 8.11 million viewers, achieving an adult 18–49 rating/share of 2.3/6.

Plot
Six months after the end of the second season, Emily pursues a new strategy after revealing to Jack her true identity she is Amanda Clarke and to take down the Graysons once and for all – on her and Daniel's wedding day – as turned allies, new enemies, and ghosts from the past threaten to expose her. With an ultimatum from Jack and her complicated history with Aiden resurfacing, Emily must take extreme measures to ensure her plan goes off without a hitch. But Victoria has new reasons to destroy the girl next door, and with her long-lost son by her side, everyone – including Nolan – may become collateral damage in Emily and Victoria's vicious war.

Cast and characters

Main cast 
 Madeleine Stowe as Victoria Grayson
 Emily VanCamp as Emily Thorne
 Gabriel Mann as Nolan Ross
 Henry Czerny as Conrad Grayson
 Nick Wechsler as Jack Porter
 Josh Bowman as Daniel Grayson
 Barry Sloane as Aiden Mathis
 Christa B. Allen as Charlotte Clarke

Recurring cast 
 Karine Vanasse as Margaux LeMarchal
 Justin Hartley as Patrick Osbourne
 Annabelle Stephenson as Sara Munello
 Henri Esteve as Javier Salgado
 Gail O'Grady as Stevie Grayson
 Olivier Martinez as Pascal LeMarchal
 Amber Valletta as Lydia Davis
 Stephanie Jacobsen as Niko Takeda
 James LeGros as Paul Whitley
 James Tupper as David Clarke
 Emily Alyn Lind as young Amanda Clarke

Guest cast 
 Brett Cullen as Jimmy Brennan
 Steven Strait as Brooks
 Wade Williams as Officer Mostrowski
 Ashley Madekwe as Ashley Davenport
 Diogo Morgado as Jorge Velez
 Anil Kumar as Rohan Kamath
 Conor Leslie as Bianca
 Jayne Brook as Loretta Munello
 Brianna Brown as Lacey
 Ana Ortiz as Bizzy Preston
 Morgan Fairchild as Teresa
 Tim DeKay as Luke Gilliam
 Roger Bart as Mason Treadwell
 Daniel Zovatto as Gideon LeMarchal
 Amy Landecker as Michelle Banks
 Margarita Levieva as Emily Porter

Episodes

Ratings

References

External links 
 
 

2013 American television seasons
2014 American television seasons
Revenge (TV series)